Bryant "Babe" Hiskey (born November 21, 1938) is an American professional golfer who played on the PGA Tour and the Champions Tour.

Hiskey was born in Burley, Idaho. He won the Idaho Amateur three times. He attended the University of Houston and was a member of the golf team. He turned professional in 1961.

In 1970, Hiskey won the Sahara Invitational by one stroke over Miller Barber, Terry Dill and Bob Goalby.

After turning 50, Hiskey played on the Senior PGA Tour (now Champions Tour). His best finish was second place at the 1995 First of America Classic.

Hiskey's brother, Jim and his nephew, Paul are also professional golfers. After retiring as a touring professional, he worked as a golf course architect. His designs include Highland Golf Course in Pocatello, Idaho. He lives in Galveston, Texas.

Amateur wins
1956 Idaho Amateur
1960 Idaho Amateur
1961 Idaho Amateur
1962 Utah State Amateur

Professional wins (6)

PGA Tour wins (3)

PGA Tour playoff record (1–0)

Other wins (3)
1962 Oklahoma Open
1970 Southern Texas PGA Championship
1983 Southern Texas PGA Championship

References

External links

American male golfers
Houston Cougars men's golfers
PGA Tour golfers
PGA Tour Champions golfers
Golfers from Idaho
Golfers from Texas
People from Burley, Idaho
People from Galveston, Texas
1938 births
Living people